The John Mock House is a house located in north Portland, Oregon, listed on the National Register of Historic Places. The Queen Anne style home constructed in 1894 was commissioned by John Mock, who owned much of the property in what is now the University Park neighborhood of Portland. The home was built as a replacement to Mock's original log cabin, which burnt in 1889. Mock died in the home at the age of 78. It sits next to Columbia Park Annex.

See also
 National Register of Historic Places listings in North Portland, Oregon

References

1894 establishments in Oregon
Houses completed in 1894
Houses on the National Register of Historic Places in Portland, Oregon
Portland Historic Landmarks
Queen Anne architecture in Oregon
University Park, Portland, Oregon